Chief Seattle Council (originally called Seattle Area Council) is the local council governing the scouting activities of the Boy Scouts of America in a large part of the Puget Sound and Seattle area, including almost all of the Olympic Peninsula.

History
In 1915 the Seattle Council was formed, changing its name to Seattle Area in 1924, and to Chief Seattle in 1954.

In 1917 the Bremerton and Port Angeles councils were formed, both ceased operation in 1919 and the Seattle Council took over were they had served. In 1956 the Olympic Area Council was formed, merging into Chief Seattle in 1974.

Organization
The council is divided into districts:
Alpine District: Its territory includes Fall City, Issaquah, North Bend, Sammamish, Snoqualmie, portions of Newcastle, and the Renton Highlands.
Aurora District: Its territory includes Lake Forest Park, North Seattle, Shoreline.
Duwamish District: Beacon Hill, Burien, Capitol Hill, Central District, Columbia City, Des Moines, Hillman City, Madrona, Montlake, Normandy Park, Rainier Beach, Rainier Valley, SeaTac, Seattle, South Seattle, Tukwila, Vashon Island, West Seattle, White Center.
Kitsap District: Bainbridge Island, Seabeck, Crosby, Bremerton, Silverdale, Port Orchard, Belfair, Bangor, Erlands Point-Kitsap Lake, Indianola, Kingston, Manchester, Navy Yard City, Olalla, Parkwood, Poulsbo, Suquamish, Tracyton.
Lake Shores: Bellevue, Washington, Juanita, Kirkland, and Mercer Island.
Mt. Olympus: Clallam and Jefferson
Mt. Tahoma: Auburn, Black Diamond, Covington, Kent, Newcastle, Maple Valley, Pacific, Renton, Skyway.
Northern Trails: Bothell, Carnation, Duvall, Kenmore, Redmond, Woodinville.

Camps

Camp Edward

Camp Edward, previously known as Camp Brinkley, is a camp in Snohomish, Washington. It was founded in 1967 and originally held a resident summer camp program for Boy Scouts, but has since transitioned to a summer camp program for Cub Scouts.

Camp Pigott

Camp Pigott, (named after former Paccar CEO and philanthropist Charles M. Pigott), has run a resident summer camp program since its re-opening in 2003. It had formerly been named Camp Omache, and had been closed since 1991.

Camp Pigott sits on Lake Hughes in Snohomish, Washington. It features a 35' high-ropes course known as the C.O.P.E. course. The course is a non-linear design so Scouts can choose a variety of challenges and pathways. The camp also includes a 42' covered climbing tower with three climbing surfaces (including a real rock surface and overhang) and one, two-lane rappelling surface. Camp Pigott also has a mountain biking course and a blacksmith shop. The camp has a dining hall that is equipped with a full size industrial kitchen, and indoor/outdoor fireplace for the main hall.

Camp Pigott is home of the Order of the Arrow T'Kope Kwiskwis Lodge's ceremonial longhouse.

Camp Sheppard

Camp Sheppard  is a camp outside of Enumclaw, Washington. Sheppard does not run a resident Scout camping program, but does run several other Scout programs including a Winter Camp program for Cub Scouts and Boy Scouts. Since 2011, Sheppard has been the location for the Council's National Youth Leadership Training, usually holding four sessions every year in the summer.

Until 2009, Camp Sheppard was a High Adventure base, where it offered programs in mountaineering, mountain biking, and backpacking.

Until 2014, it hosted the "Mom & Me/Dad & Me" Cub Scout camping programs, after which they were moved to Camp Edward.

Camp Parsons

Founded in 1919, Camp Parsons  is the oldest continuous running Boy Scout camp west of the Mississippi River and one of the oldest continually running Boy Scout camps in the United States on its original location. The site of the camp was chosen by Professor Edmund Meany, Major Edward Ingraham and members of the Seattle Area Council. It was purchased from John Strom in May 1919 and named after the first council president, Reginald H. Parsons. Booth Hall (the current Silver Marmot Grill) was constructed in May and June 1919 and continues to be used today. On July 7, 1919, 100 Scouts arrived at Camp Parsons for its first season that ran 6 weeks and has not stopped since. A separate camp for Cub Scouts was developed on the property in 1937 and named Camp Meany in honor of the late Professor Edmund Meany, first Scout commissioner for Seattle. This camp was merged into Camp Parsons in 1941 and that camp's dining hall served as the dining hall for Camp Parsons until the summer 2014 after which it was razed and a new dining hall was constructed and dedicated in June 2015.

Thousands of Scouts from the Pacific Northwest and throughout the United States and Canada attend camp each summer. Camp Parsons is the only Boy Scout Camp that uses a salt water beach for all aquatic activities. Camp Parsons also has hiking treks for Scouts to explore the Olympic Mountains and Kayak treks to explore the Hood Canal.

Order of the Arrow

Chief Seattle Council's local lodge in the Order of the Arrow is T'kope Kwiskwis, founded in 1954. The name translates to '[The Order of] the Silver Marmot' and refers to the council's original honor society that originated at Camp Parsons, the Silver Marmot. Unlike other lodges around the United States, which wear the Plains Indian style of regalia for their ceremonies, T'Kope, along with neighboring lodges  wears button blankets.

In April 2013, T'Kope Kwiskwis completed the reconstruction of a ceremonial longhouse at Camp Pigott that is used for Order of the Arrow ceremonies.

The T'Kope Kwiskwis lodge won the 2012 OA National Service Award.

See also
Scouting in Washington

References

External links

Local councils of the Boy Scouts of America
Western Region (Boy Scouts of America)
Youth organizations based in Washington (state)